Döhlau is a municipality in Upper Franconia in the district of Hof in Bavaria in Germany. It lies on the Saale River.

References

Hof (district)

pl:Döhlau